Harken, Inc. is an international manufacturer specializing in performance sailing hardware, headquartered in Pewaukee, Wisconsin, United States.  The company was founded in a 60-foot trailer in 1967 by brothers Peter Harken and Olaf Harken. Originally, the brothers manufactured sailboats under the name Vanguard and kept the hardware business separate so they could sell to competing boatbuilders.  Gary Comer, founder of Lands' End clothing company, advised and helped them distribute their first blocks by placing them in the Lands' End catalogue.

In 1986, Vanguard Sailboats was spun off to Stephen Clark in Rhode Island so that the brothers could focus on hardware. Harken hardware has been a dominant force in the racing segment for many years, making its Olympic and America's Cup debuts in 1976 and 1977, respectively.

Harken's primary manufacturing plants are the Pewaukee headquarters and the Italian office in Limido Comasco, Como.  Harken has sales and service offices in USA (Rhode Island, California, Florida), France, Japan, Poland, Slovenia, Sweden, Australia, New Zealand, and the United Kingdom.

Harken equipment may be found on racing boats as small as the 7-foot Optimist (dinghy) to mega yachts and ocean racers.

References 

 "Harken Named Company of the Decade." boats.com; December 10, 2000.
 Decker, Eric. "Harken's Innovation Created International Market for Sailing Gear." Small Business Times; June 23, 2006.
 Sailing World Hall of Fame, Sailing World Magazine. April 24, 2002. Sailing World Magazine.
 "Ernst & Young 2008 Entrepreneurs of the Year." Twin Cities Business; August 2008.
 "Anchored Our Way: Pewaukee sail accessory maker hopes to expand at home."  The Milwaukee Journal; August 12, 2007.
 Rovito, Rich. "Harken Yacht sails high seas of growth." The Business Journal of Milwaukee; June 30, 2006.
 "Honor roll of U.S. exporters." Business America; March 12, 1990.
 "Honor roll of U.S. exporters – President's "E" Award." Business America; April 5, 1993.
 "Saving Sailing." Sailing Anarchy; September 16, 2009.
 Bednarek, David. "Sailing Around the World: Harken wins National Award for its Success with Exports." The Milwaukee Journal; August 16, 1993.
 Maloney, Lawrence. "Sailing into the Future." Design News; June 17, 1991.
 Cole, Tim. "No Sitting Duck." Popular Mechanics; August 1990.
 "Concept Yacht." Popular Mechanics; August 1986.
 Quandt, Matt. Local Library Gets an Observatory. Astronomy.com Blog; May 22, 2009.

Sailing equipment manufacturers
American boat builders
Companies based in Wisconsin
Waukesha County, Wisconsin